Bisahan is a village in the Beri tehsil of Jhajjar district of Haryana, India.

Today, Bisahan is well known for Ghdoi dham (स्वर्ग स्थल)and also for number of officers and soldiers it contributes to the Indian Army and other Armed Forces of India. The village made news in October 2014 when General Dalbir Singh Suhag was appointed as a new Army Chief of India.

Government 
As per constitution of India and Panchyati Raaj Act, Bisahan is administrated by a Sarpanch -Inderjeet Suhag, Namberdar - Sh. Kuldeep Singh (Soul of Bisahan).

Population and literacy 
According to the 2011 population census, Bisahan has a population of 2318, of which 1216 are males and 1102 are females. The number of children aged 0–6 is 299, which accounts for 12.90% of the total residents. The average sex ratio of Bisahan is 906, higher than Haryana state average of 879. The child sex ratio is 967, higher than Haryana average of 834.

Bisahan has a higher literacy rate compared to Haryana. In 2011, the average literacy rate in Bisahan was 79.89% compared to 75.55% in Haryana. In Bisahan, male literacy was 91.07% while female literacy rate was 67.43%.

Transportation
Bisahan is situated near the town of Beri on Gurgaon-Sirsa Highway with road access to several major cities like Rohtak, Bhiwani, Gurgaon, Faridabad, Delhi, Chandigarh and Jaipur.

The Bisahan village bus stand has no regular services to Beri, so villagers use their own vehicles to go to the Beri bus stand from where regular bus services are available to the nearby cities, towns and villages. These services include Jhajjar-Delhi, Rohtak-Panipat-Karnal-Ambala-Chandigarh, Jhajjar-Gurgaon-Faridabad-Palwal-Nuh-Mathura, Kalanaur-Bhiwani-Tosham-Siwani and Meham-Hansi-Hisar-Fatehabad-Sirsa-Dabwali-Ellenabad-Bhatinda-Sri Ganganagar.

The nearest railway station to the Bisahan village is Jhajjar railway station . Other major stations close to Bisahan are Rohtak , Bhiwani , Rewari  and Delhi .

Notable people 
 (Retd) Indian Army Chief General Dalbir Singh

References 

Villages in Jhajjar district